Nueva Ecija, the largest province in Central Luzon, is a historic province with colorful and remarkable festivals. This province, with 5 cities and 27 municipalities, has diverse cultural traditions that became significant part of Novo Ecijanos culture and tradition.

History

San Jose City is a 2nd class city in the province of Nueva Ecija, Philippines. It is the northernmost city of the province. According to the 2000 census, it has a population of 108,254 people in 23,191 households.
Before the city was founded by the Spaniards, it is known as Kabaritan, named for the plant commonly seen in the area.
With its wide plains, agriculture is the main source of livelihood in the city. It is part of the rice granary of the Philippines. But the agricultural produce of the city also includes vegetables, fruits and onions. It is now a leading producer of onions in the country. Every year the Tanduyong festival is held on April coinciding with the annual fiesta to celebrate this. Tanduyong  is a variety of Shallot grown in the area.

The Festival
San Jose City prides itself as the "Onion Capital of the Philippines"  and is a leading producer of onion, garlic, rice and vegetables. Every year, on the fourth Sunday of April, the people of San Jose dance through the main street in a colorful, enchanting celebration of the blessing of the harvest. On festival day, the streets are filled with contingents of dancers outfitted in striking, multi-hued native costumes. Exotic rhythms of improvised musical instruments fill the air as the dancers gyrate and sway to the beat of life. Special activities included are: beauty contest, tourism and trade fair, awarding ceremony and cultural shows.

References

External links

 Department of Tourism
 San Jose City website
 Nueva Ecija Wikipedia

Festivals in the Philippines
Harvest festivals
San Jose, Nueva Ecija
Culture of Nueva Ecija
Tourist attractions in Nueva Ecija